Arthopyreniaceae is a family of fungi in the order Pleosporales. It contains six genera.

References

External links 
 Arthopyreniaceae at Index Fungorum

Pleosporales
Dothideomycetes families
Lichen families